Iowa Township is one of twenty townships in Benton County, Iowa, USA.  As of the 2000 census, its population is 423.

Geography
According to the United States Census Bureau, Iowa Township covers an area of 32.81 square miles (84.98 square kilometers); of this, 32.74 square miles (84.8 square kilometers, 99.79 percent) is land and 0.07 square miles (0.18 square kilometers, 0.21 percent) is water.

Cities, towns, villages
 Luzerne (west half)

The city of Belle Plaine is entirely within this township geographically but is a separate entity.

Unincorporated towns
 Irving at 
(This list is based on USGS data and may include former settlements.)

Adjacent townships
 Kane Township (north)
 Union Township (northeast)
 Leroy Township (east)
 Marengo Township, Iowa County (southeast)
 Honey Creek Township, Iowa County (south)
 Jefferson Township, Poweshiek County (southwest)
 Belle Plaine Township (west)
 Salt Creek Township, Tama County (west)
 York Township, Tama County (northwest)

Cemeteries
The township contains these three cemeteries: Beal, Lutheran and Wright.

Major highways
  Iowa Highway 21

Airports and landing strips
 Belle Plaine Municipal Airport

School districts
 Belle Plaine Community School District
 Benton Community School District

Political districts
 Iowa's 3rd congressional district
 State House District 39
 State Senate District 20

References
 United States Census Bureau 2007 TIGER/Line Shapefiles
 United States Board on Geographic Names (GNIS)
 United States National Atlas

External links

 
US-Counties.com
City-Data.com

Townships in Benton County, Iowa
Cedar Rapids, Iowa metropolitan area
Townships in Iowa